Edith Mühlberghuber (born 22 October 1964) is an Austrian politician who has been a Member of the National Council for the Freedom Party of Austria (FPÖ) since 2008.

References

1964 births
Living people
Members of the National Council (Austria)
Freedom Party of Austria politicians
21st-century Austrian women politicians
21st-century Austrian politicians